Istvan Nemet is a former association football player who represented New Zealand at international level.

National Youth Career:

1954–1957 Yugoslavia Serbia    
– National caps = 5
– National goals = 15

Istvan Stefan Nemet played four official A-international matches for New Zealand in 1967, the first three of which were at the Vietnam National Day Soccer Tournament. He scored on his debut in a 3–5 loss to trans-Tasman neighbours Australia on 5 November 1967, followed by a 3–1 win over Singapore on 8 November and a 1–5 loss to South Vietnam on 10 November 1967. He scored the second of his 2 goals in his final official appearance, an 8–2 win over Malaysia on 16 November 1967.

References 

Living people
New Zealand association footballers
New Zealand international footballers
New Zealand people of Hungarian descent
1942 births
Association footballers not categorized by position